Shanderman District is a district (bakhsh) in Masal County, Gilan Province, Iran. At the 2006 census, its population was 21,585, in 5,442 families.  The District has one city: Bazar Jomeh. The District has two rural districts (dehestan): Shanderman Rural District and Sheykh Neshin Rural District.

References 

Masal County
Districts of Gilan Province